"Oh, Mother of Mine" is a 1961 song that was released as a Miracle label single by Motown singing group The Temptations. It was the group's debut single for Motown, after signing with them in January of that year.

Credits
 Lead vocals by Paul Williams (song) and Eddie Kendricks (bridge)
 Background vocals by Eddie Kendricks, Melvin Franklin, Al Bryant and Otis Williams
 Instrumentation by The Funk Brothers

References

1961 debut singles
The Temptations songs
Songs written by William "Mickey" Stevenson
Songs written by Otis Williams
1961 songs